Gajgin (also Romanized as Gajgīn and Gojgīn; also known as Gajkīn) is a village in Sar Asiab-e Farsangi Rural District, in the Central District of Kerman County, Kerman Province, Iran. At the 2006 census, its population was just 247, in 62 families.

References 

Populated places in Kerman County